This article displays the rosters for the participating teams at the 2007 FIBA Africa Club Championship for Women.

Abidjan Basket Club

Arc-en-Ciel

Desportivo de Maputo

Djoliba

Dolphins

Ferroviário de Maputo

First Bank

ISPU

Kenya Ports Authority

Lupopo

Primeiro de Agosto

References

External links
 2007 FIBA Africa Champions Cup Participating Teams

FIBA Africa Women's Clubs Champions Cup squads
Basketball teams in Africa
FIBA
FIBA